Adrian Câciu (born February 20, 1974) is a Romanian economist and politician. Since November 25, 2021, he has been Minister of Finance in the Government of Nicolae Ciucă, and a member of the Social Democratic Party.

Education
In 1997, he graduated in international relations and business from the Academy of Economic Studies in Bucharest. In 2011, he obtained a master's degree in managing rural development projects at the same university.

Politics
 He was director of the office of the Secretary of State and a member of the management committee of Agentia Domeniilor Statului, an agricultural real estate agency. In November 2021, on the recommendation of the Social Democratic Party, he became the minister of finance in the then-formed government headed by Nicolae Ciucă.

References

Bucharest Academy of Economic Studies alumni
Social Democratic Party (Romania) politicians
21st-century Romanian economists
Romanian Ministers of Finance
1974 births
Living people